Peter Caulder was a soldier and settler in the United States. Exclusionary acts chased him and his family as well as others from Arkansas.

A native of South Carolina he married Eliza Hall. Arkansas governor Asa Hutchinson proclaimed a Peter Caulder Remembrance Day. Historian Billy D. Higgins wrote a book about him. Caulder's name was added to the war memorial to the War of 1812 on the Ariansas Capitol grounds.

References

Year of birth missing (living people)
Military personnel from Arkansas